The Institute of Directors in New Zealand (IoD) is a New Zealand-based organisation that supports, represents and sets standards for directors in New Zealand. It began 40 years ago as a division of the Institute of Directors in the UK, but became a separate legal entity in 1989. The IoD has eight regional branches throughout New Zealand - five in the North Island and three in the South Island. Its head office is based in Wellington.

The president of the IoD is Julia Hoare. The chief executive of the IoD is Kirsten Patterson.

References

External links 
Website

Business and finance professional associations
Institute of Directors